Fisheye is a 1980 animated short film by Joško Marušić for Zagreb Film. The film is a part of the National Film Collection, preserved by the Croatian State Archives.

Synopsis and development
Fisheye depicts a natural reverse in which fish-like monsters invade a coastal village, capturing and killing all of the inhabitants through clubbing or maiming. The visuals are executed with a woodcut-like quality, with a score by Ivica Simović utilizing a twelve-tone technique consisting of seven cellos.

Reception
Stanislav Matacic, writing for International Psychoanalytical Association, describes it as a horror film using a unique art style and a Hitchcock-like soundtrack, praising it as a timeless piece of art. Dan Piepenbring, writing for The Paris Review, described it as an inspiring blend of macabre and mundane. It won the award for Best Short Film Director at Sitges Film Festival in 1980.

References

External links

1980 animated films
1980 films
Croatian animated short films
Yugoslav animated short films
Zagreb Film films